Hal Harrison Gibson III, known as Tripp Gibson (born August 5, 1981), is an American Major League Baseball umpire who wears uniform number 73. Gibson's first Major League game was July 8, 2013, at Chase Field in Phoenix, Arizona. He was promoted to a full-time position in January 2015. Prior to his hiring, he worked as a substitute teacher during the offseason.

Gibson worked his first postseason in 2017, umpiring in the 2017 American League Wild Card Game.

He has participated in UMPS CARE charity events, such as bowling and golf tournaments, as well as visiting injured soldiers at Walter Reed Army Medical Center. In 2021 Tripp Gibson was rated the most accurate home plate umpire for balls and strikes 

On November 2, 2022, Gibson was behind home plate for the Houston Astros combined no-hitter in a 5-0 win in Game 4 of the World Series vs the Philadelphia Phillies.

References

External links
Retrosheet
Close Call Sports profile

1981 births
Living people
Major League Baseball umpires
People from Mayfield, Kentucky
Sportspeople from Kentucky
Murray State University alumni